The 2020–21 UMass Lowell River Hawks Men's ice hockey season was the 54th season of play for the program, the 38th season competing at the Division I level, and the 37th season in the Hockey East conference. The River Hawks represented the University of Massachusetts Lowell and were coached by Norm Bazin, in his 10th season.

Season
As a result of the ongoing COVID-19 pandemic the entire college ice hockey season was delayed. Because the NCAA had previously announced that all winter sports athletes would retain whatever eligibility they possessed through at least the following year, none of Massachusetts–Lowell's players would lose a season of play. However, the NCAA also approved a change in its transfer regulations that would allow players to transfer and play immediately rather than having to sit out a season, as the rules previously required.

UMass-Lowell was heavily impacted by COVID-19 early in the season. After a delayed start, the team played just 4 games in the first two months of the campaign. Entering their game with UMass on the 29th of January, Lowell had played just 4 games while the Minutemen had competed in 17. The lack of playing time appeared to hurt the River Hawks since the team, which had been highly ranked entering the season, swiftly fell out of the top-20. UML appeared to regain its form by the end of the regular season, but by then their only path into the NCAA Tournament was with a conference championship. The River Hawks won their first postseason game without much difficulty and entered the quarterfinals having to beat Boston University to stay alive. Despite being on a 4-game unbeaten streak, Owen Savory was replaced as the starting goaltender by freshman Henry Welsch and the move paid off. While he only faced 17 shots in the game, Welsch turned aside all but one and helped Lowell advance to the semifinals. Here the team's run was expected to end as they faced the top ranked team in the nation, Boston College. The Eagles built a 3-goal lead after two periods and looked to be sailing into the championship, but the River Hawks' offense awoke in the third, scoring three times to tie the game. Less than two minutes later, however, BC was again in the lead with a power play goal. Welsch was pulled for an extra attacker and in less than a minute UML had again tied the score. It took another 34 minutes of game time for the winning goal to be scored and UML's Matt Brown netted the biggest goal for the River Hawks all season.

Lowell faced off against Massachusetts for the Hockey East championship. Welsch continued his strong play but the Minutemen defense was stifling, allowed the Hawks only 16 shots on goal, none of which found the back of the net. UMass Lowell has to settle for second place but the team had redeemed itself for an otherwise disappointing campaign.

Ben McEvoy sat out the season.

Departures

Recruiting

Roster
As of February 12, 2021.

|}

Standings

Schedule and Results

|-
!colspan=12 style=";" | Regular Season

|-
!colspan=12 style=";" |

Scoring statistics

Goaltending statistics

Rankings

USCHO did not release a poll in week 20.

References

2020–21
2020–21 Hockey East men's ice hockey season
2020–21 NCAA Division I men's ice hockey by team
2020–21 in American ice hockey by team
2021 in sports in Massachusetts
2020 in sports in Massachusetts